Negative interest on excess reserves is an instrument of unconventional monetary policy applied by central banks to encourage lending by making it costly for commercial banks to hold their excess reserves at central banks so they will lend more readily to the private sector. Such a policy is usually a response to very slow economic growth, deflation, and deleveraging.

During economic downturns, central banks often lower interest rates to stimulate growth. Until late in the 20th century, it was thought that rates could not go below zero because banks would hold onto cash instead of paying a fee to deposit it. It turns out this was not quite right. Central banks in Europe and in Japan have demonstrated rates can go negative, and several have pushed them in that direction for the same reason they lowered them to zero in the first place—to provide stimulus and, where inflation is below target, to raise the inflation rate. The notion is that negative rates will provide even more incentive for commercial banks to make loans. What might have looked like a potential lending project, by a bank, not worth funding even in a low-interest-rate environment might now look attractive if the alternative is being charged to store money at the central bank or holding a large amount of cash.

Examples

Europe

The European Central Bank and central banks of other European countries, such as Sweden, Switzerland, and Denmark, have paid negative interest on excess reserves—in effect taxing banks for exceeding their reserve requirements—as an expansionary monetary policy measure.

Negative rates in Europe have been controversial. Ambrose Evans-Pritchard of the London Telegraph has described them as a "calamitous misadventure." Economists for the European Central Bank argue that across the euro area, loans from banks to corporations have become less expensive since negative rates were adopted.

Japan

In January 2016, the Bank of Japan followed European central banks and lowered its interest rates below zero, after several years of keeping them at the lower end of the positive range. The existing balances will keep on yielding a rate of 0.1 percent; the reserves that banks are required to keep at the BOJ will have a rate of zero percent, and a rate of minus 0.1 percent will be applied to any other reserves.

United States
The staff of the U.S. Federal Reserve prepared a memo for the Federal Open Market Committee in August 2010 evaluating the possibility of lowering the interest rate that the Fed paid on bank reserves to zero or below. The staff was lukewarm on the idea, and it was never adopted in the U.S. Former chairman of the Federal Reserve Ben Bernanke has argued that "negative rates appear to have both modest benefits and manageable costs" and "modestly negative" interest rates should be an option for the Fed to consider if it ever again confronts a very weak economy at a time when short-term interest rates already have been cut to zero.

See also
 Constant purchasing power accounting
 Excess reserves
 Forward guidance
 IOER – interest on excess reserves
 Negative interest rate
 Quantitative tightening
 Zero interest rate policy (ZIRP)

References

External links
 Why has the ECB introduced a negative interest rate? (European Central Bank, June, 2014)
 "The ECB's Negative Interest Rate: The Fed May Be Forced To Follow Its Lead" (former Dallas Federal Reserve President Bob McTeer, Forbes, June 5, 2014)
 "Will the European Central Bank’s negative interest rate be an economic positive?" (Simone Pathe, PBS Newshour, June 9, 2014)

Further reading
Keister, Todd (November 16, 2011). Why Is There a “Zero Lower Bound” on Interest Rates? Federal Reserve Bank of New York. Liberty Street Economics blog. Retrieved 2 April 2020.
 

Monetary policy
Taxation and redistribution